Djair Veiga Francisco Junior (born 10 February 1991), commonly known as Djair, is a Brazilian association football player who plays as a central midfielder for Desportivo Brasil.

References

External links

Djair at ZeroZero

1991 births
Living people
Brazilian footballers
Brazilian expatriate footballers
Association football midfielders
Campeonato Brasileiro Série A players
Campeonato Brasileiro Série B players
Kategoria Superiore players
Coritiba Foot Ball Club players
Joinville Esporte Clube players
Figueirense FC players
Sport Club Internacional players
Agremiação Sportiva Arapiraquense players
Grêmio Catanduvense de Futebol players
Tombense Futebol Clube players
Clube Atlético Tubarão players
KF Skënderbeu Korçë players
Marist F.C. players
Esporte Clube Mamoré players
Desportivo Brasil players
Footballers at the 2011 Pan American Games
Expatriate footballers in Albania
Expatriate footballers in the Solomon Islands
Brazilian expatriate sportspeople in Albania
Pan American Games competitors for Brazil
People from Barretos